Vyatskaya Peak is a peak, 2,455 m, on the north part of Skavlrimen Ridge in the Weyprecht Mountains, Queen Maud Land. Discovered and plotted from air photos by German Antarctic Expedition, 1938–39. Mapped from air photos and surveys by Norwegian Antarctic Expedition, 1956–60; remapped by Soviet Antarctic Expedition, 1960–61, and named presumedly after the Vyatka River.  This name originates from United States of America. It is part of the United States Gazetteer and the SCAR Composite Gazetteer of Antarctica.

References

Mountains of Queen Maud Land
Princess Astrid Coast